Henri Boulard was a French  microbiologist who discovered the yeast Saccharomyces boulardii in 1923. He noticed people chewing on the skins of lychees and mangosteens to treat diarrhea during a cholera epidemic. He isolated and identified this strain of yeast, a probiotic.  He sold his patented strain of saccharomyces boulardii to Biocodex, a French pharmaceutical company in the 1950s.  This probiotic is used to improve gut health and treat diarrhea and is available in the US as Florastor.

References 

20th-century French biologists
French microbiologists
Year of birth missing
Year of death missing